Severin Sägesser (born ) is a Swiss cyclo-cross cyclist. He represented his nation in the men's elite event at the 2016 UCI Cyclo-cross World Championships in Heusden-Zolder.

Major results
2013–2014
 2nd National Under-23 Championships
2016–2017
 3rd Flückiger Cross Madiswil
2017–2018
 3rd National Championships

References

External links
 Official website
 

1992 births
Living people
Cyclo-cross cyclists
Swiss male cyclists
Place of birth missing (living people)